D. robusta may refer to:
 Daubentonia robusta, the giant aye-aye, an extinct mammal species that lived in Madagascar
 Derris robusta, a tree species found in India
 Deschampsia robusta, a grass species found on Gough Island
 Drosophila robusta, a fly species

See also 
 Robusta (disambiguation)